Ḫaldi (d,Ḫaldi, also known as Khaldi) was one of the three chief deities of Urartu (Urarat/Ararat Kingdom) along with Teisheba and Shivini. He was a warrior god to whom the kings of Urartu would pray for victories in battle. Ḫaldi was portrayed as a man with or without wings, standing on a lion.

His principle shrine was at Ardini (Muṣaṣir). The temples dedicated to Khaldi were adorned with weapons such as swords, spears, bows and arrows, and shields hung from the walls and were sometimes known as "the house of weapons".

History
According to Urartologist Paul Zimansky, Haldi was not a native Urartian god but apparently an obscure Akkadian deity (which explains the location of the main temple of worship for Haldi in Musasir, believed to be near modern Rawandiz, Iraq). Haldi was not initially worshipped by Urartians, at least as their chief god, as his cult does not appear to have been introduced until the reign of Ishpuini.

According to Michael C. Astour, Haldi could be etymologically related to the Hurrian word "heldi", meaning "high". An alternate theory postulates that the name could be of Indo-European (possibly Helleno-Armenian) or Old Armenian origin, meaning "sun god" (compare with Hellenic Helios and Roman Sol). The Urartian Kings used to erect steles dedicated to Ḫaldi in which they inscribed the successes of their military campaigns, the buildings built, and also the agricultural activities that took place during their reign.

Mythology
Along with Ḫaldi of Ardini, the other two chief deities of Urartu were Theispas of Kumenu, and Shivini of Tushpa. Of all the gods of the Urartian pantheon, the most inscriptions are dedicated to Ḫaldi. His wife was the goddess Arubani and/or the goddess Bagvarti.

He was the primary god of the most prominent group of Urartian tribes, which eventually evolved into the Armenian nation. Some sources claim that the legendary patriarch and founder of the Armenians, Hayk, is derived from Ḫaldi, but other theories about the etymology of Hayk are more widely accepted.

Haldi's depiction in Uratian art has been the subject of confusion, and as of 2012 no images of him explicitly labelled as such were known. In 1963, Margarete Riemschneider proposed that Haldi was "pictureless" and never depicted in Uratian imagery, and suggested that he was symbolized by a lance. Zimansky in 2012 wrote that he had been a skeptic of this theory, but "I think it unlikely that the paucity of securely identified depictions of Haldi can be due entirely to the poverty of secure identifications in Uratian art generally" and suggested that one image, of a man surrounded by flames leading a pantheon of gods into battle, might represent the king: a "mortal agent...empowered by the divine".

Gallery

References

 

Urartian deities
War gods
Lion deities
Armenian gods